Jean Colombe (b. Bourges ca. 1430; d. ca. 1493) was a French miniature painter and illuminator of manuscripts. He is best known for his work in Très Riches Heures du Duc de Berry. He was a son of Philippe Colombe and his wife Guillemette and thus the brother of the sculptor Michel Colombe.

Work
In 1470–1472, Colombe created the miniatures of the Heures de Louis de Laval; around 1475, he illuminated the crusader chronicles, Les Passages d'oultre mer du noble Godefroy de Bouillon, du bon roy Saint Loys et de plusieurs vertueux princes, by Sébastien Mamerot. Both works had been commissioned by Louis de Laval. Between 1485 and 1490, Jean Colombe completed the decoration of the Très Riches Heures which had been left unfinished in 1416. He executed the image for the month of November (below the zodiac arch), completed the Limbourg brothers’ design for September, and retouched other images.

Further reading
Thierry Delcourt, Fabrice Masanès, Danielle Quéruel (eds.): Sebastien Mamerot: Les Passages D'Outremer: A Chronicle of the Crusades Taschen 2009  (facsimie edition)

External links

1430 births
1493 deaths
French artists
Manuscript illuminators